Astictopterus jama, the forest hopper or coon, is a species of butterfly in the family Hesperiidae. It is found in Southeast Asia.

The larvae feed on Miscanthus sinensis.

Subspecies
Astictopterus jama jama (Thailand, Langkawi, Malaysia, Tioman, Aur, Singapore, Sumatra, Java)
Astictopterus jama chinensis (Leech, 1890) (China)
Astictopterus jama olivascens Moore, 1878 (Sikkim to Burma, Andamans, Thailand, Laos, Vietnam, Hainan, southern China, Yunnan)

References

Butterflies described in 1860
Astictopterini
Butterflies of Indochina
Butterflies of Asia
Taxa named by Rudolf Felder
Taxa named by Baron Cajetan von Felder